Hamilton Valley is a suburb of the city of Albury, New South Wales, located north-west of the Albury Central Business District and west of Lavington. As a result, the population was probably closer to 450. 

Hamilton Valley lies in a valley that broadly separates the Nail Can Hill and Black Ranges. It is surrounded by Table Top/Ettamogah to the north, Lavington to the east, Splitters Creek to the west and Glenroy to the south.
Features of the area include the Panthers Lavington Sports Club and the Glenmorus Gardens Cemetery and Crematorium.

Geography 
Hamilton Valley is a developing residential suburb but has large rural areas. The valley is located on a branch of the Bungambrawatha Creek heading out towards Jindera. It is bound by Urana Road, Reservoir Road to the east, Glenroy to the south and Splitters Creek to the west.

Sport
Hamilton Valley plays host to the Lavington Sports Ground which is the ground of the Lavington Panthers Football Club.

Residents 
The most common religion was Catholic, followed by Anglican, and the average household income was $1,472, above the Australian average of $1,438. The median age was 31.

References 

Suburbs of Albury, New South Wales